Pedro Consuegra (24 August 1930 – 18 December 2000) was an Argentine water polo player. He competed in the men's tournament at the 1960 Summer Olympics.

References

External links
 

1930 births
2000 deaths
Argentine male water polo players
Olympic water polo players of Argentina
Water polo players at the 1960 Summer Olympics
Sportspeople from Santa Fe, Argentina